Ōno Gorōemon was a 13th-century Japanese sculptor. His exact date of birth and death are unknown.

Gorōemon was of the Kei school, which flourished in the Kamakura period. Aside from his artwork, Gorōemon left little record of his life. He is speculated as one of the possible casters (along with Tanji Hisatomo) of the "Great Buddha" (大仏 Daibutsu), a bronze statue of Amitābha Buddha at the Kōtoku-in temple around 1252.

References

Japanese Buddhists
Japanese sculptors
13th-century Japanese artists
Year of birth unknown
Year of death unknown